"Sink In" is a song by British musician Tirzah. It was produced by Mica Levi aka Micachu. The single was released on 20 May 2021. "Sink In" was described as a song being "forming somewhat of a blank page, ready to be filled in.

Music video
The video for "Sink In" features a dance performance with choreography by Lewis Walker and Tylor Deyn, and was directed by Leah Walker, who also did the video for “Send Me."

Track listing

References

External links
 Tirzah - Sink In (Music Video on YouTube)

2021 singles
2021 songs
Tirzah_(musician)_songs